The Pioneer Inn in Maui, Hawaii, was built in 1901.  It is a contributing building in the Lahaina Historic District, a U.S. National Historic Landmark.  It is the oldest hotel in Lahaina and on the island of Maui and the oldest in continuous operation in the state of Hawaii.

It is one of National Registry of the Historic Hotels of America.

References

External links

Hotels in Hawaii
Lahaina, Hawaii
Historic Hotels of America